China Energy Investment Corporation, more commonly known as China Energy, is a state-owned mining and energy company administrated by the SASAC of the State Council of the People's Republic of China.

History
On August 28, 2017, SASAC announced that China Guodian Corporation and Shenhua Group will be jointly restructured. Shenhua Group will become China Energy Investment Corporation Limited and will absorb China Guodian Corporation. It will be the largest power company in the world by installed capacity.

Operations
China Energy is engaged in development, investment, construction, operation and management of power plants and power generation for electricity supply in China. It also mines coal; operates railroads, ports and seaborne shipments; produces polyethylene and polypropylene; and undertakes research, development, and demonstrations activities.

References

External links
  

Electric power companies of China
Government-owned companies of China
Chinese companies established in 2017
Energy companies established in 2017
Companies based in Beijing